Far til fire med fuld musik is a 1961 Danish family film directed by Alice O'Fredericks and Robert Saaskin.

Cast
 Karl Stegger as Far
 Peter Malberg as Onkel Anders
 Agnes Rehni as Fru Sejrsen
 Hanne Borchsenius as Søs
 Ib Mossin as Peter (and voice of Mister)
 Rudi Hansen as Mie
 Otto Møller Jensen as Ole
 Ole Neumann as Lille Per
 Einar Juhl as Rektor
 Kirsten Passer as Frk. Ludvigsen
 Jørgen Buckhøj as Betjent
 Gunnar Lemvigh as Opdageren
 Ove Rud as Købmanden
 Torsten Fønss as Leif
 Leo Bandrup Knudsen as Ulf
 Poul Finn Poulsen as Klaus
 Dorte Bjørndal as Nina
 Harald Nielsen as Mister (dubbed by Ib Mossin)
 Helmer Bonde as Jens

External links

1961 films
1960s Danish-language films
Films directed by Alice O'Fredericks
Films scored by Sven Gyldmark
ASA Filmudlejning films
Father of Four